The Séminaire Lotharingien de Combinatoire (English: Lotharingian Seminar of Combinatorics) is a peer-reviewed academic journal specialising in combinatorial mathematics, named after Lotharingia.

It has existed since 1980 as a regular joint seminar in Combinatorics for the Universities of Bayreuth, Erlangen and Strasbourg. In 1994, it was decided to create a journal under the same name. The regular meetings continue to this day.

See also

M. Lothaire

References

External links
 Séminaire Lotharingien de Combinatoire

Combinatorics journals
Open access journals